León Ó Broin (10 November 1902 – 26 February 1990) was an Irish civil servant, known as a writer and playwright.  He wrote many plays, stories and historical works in both English and Irish.

Life
He was born in Dublin, and joined Sinn Féin and Fianna Éireann while still at school.

He was imprisoned in 1921 and 1922 and afterwards joined the Free State army as a non-combatant. In 1924 he was the first Administrative Officer appointed by the new Free State civil service, where he worked mainly in the Department of Finance.  He was Secretary of the Department of Posts and Telegraphs from 1948 to 1967.

Together with Frank Duff he formed the Pillar of Fire Society in 1942, for Catholic-Jewish dialogue, after rumours about the killing of  Jews in Europe starting coming through to Ireland. He presented a paper at the first meeting, helped by a Jewish colleague and friend, Laurence Elyan.

Writings

Books in Irish
Arus na nGábhadh agus Scéalta Eile (Dublin 1923)
Ag Strachadh leis an Saol agus Scéalta Eile (Dublin 1929)
An Rún agus Scéalta Eile (Dublin 1933)
Parnell (Dublin: Oifig an tSoláthair 1937)
Miss Crookshank agus Emmet (Dublin: Sairseal & Dill 1954)
Miss Crookshank agus Coirp Eile (Dublin: Sairseal & Dill 1951) 
Comhcheilg sa Chaisleán (Dublin 1963) 
Na Sasanaigh agus Eirí Amach na Cásca (Dublin: Sáirséal agus Dill 1967).
An Maidíneach: Staraí na nÉireannach Aontaithe (Dublin 1971)

Plays
Slan Muirisg (1944)
An Boisgín Ceoil (1945)
An Oíche úd i mBeithil (1949).

Translations
An Fuadach (1931) Kidnapped by R L Stevenson
Cogadh na Reann (1934)  War of the Worlds by H.G. Wells

Books in English

See also
 Parnell Commission The conspiracy case written about by Ó Broin.
 Irish History

References

External links
 Broadcasting the Angelus bell

1902 births
1990 deaths
20th-century Irish male writers
Irish-language writers
Irish Republican Army (1919–1922) members
People of the Irish Civil War (Pro-Treaty side)
Irish male non-fiction writers
Irish male short story writers
Members of the Royal Irish Academy
20th-century Irish short story writers
Writers from Dublin (city)
Civil servants from Dublin (city)
20th-century Irish non-fiction writers